Puyango may refer to:

 Puyango River, the name in Ecuador for the Tumbes River, flowing from Ecuador through Peru to the Pacific Ocean
 Puyango Canton, Ecuador
 Puyango Petrified Forest, Ecuador